
Mrągowo County is a unit of territorial administration and local government (powiat) in Warmian-Masurian Voivodeship, northern Poland. It came into being on January 1, 1999, as a result of the Polish local government reforms passed in 1998.

As of 2006 its total population is 50,087, out of which the population of Mrągowo is 21,772, that of Mikołajki is 3,848, and the rural population is 24,467.

Neighbouring counties
Mrągowo County is bordered by Kętrzyn County to the north, Giżycko County to the east, Pisz County to the south-east, Szczytno County to the south and Olsztyn County to the west.

Administrative division
The county is subdivided into five gminas (one urban, one urban-rural and three rural). These are listed in the following table, in descending order of population.

References
Polish official population figures 2006

 
Land counties of Warmian-Masurian Voivodeship